3C 212 is a quasar located in the constellation Cancer.

References

External links
 Detailed CCD image of 3C 212 based on 60 min total exposure

Quasars
212
Cancer (constellation)